Pierre Naudet (23 December 1922, Paris – 17 December 1997) was a French politician. He represented the Radical Party in the National Assembly from 1956 to 1958.

References

1922 births
1997 deaths
Politicians from Paris
Radical Party (France) politicians
Deputies of the 3rd National Assembly of the French Fourth Republic